H7, H07 or H-7 may refer to:
 H7 Chaffron Way, a road part of the Milton Keynes grid road system
 British NVC community H7, a heath communities in the British National Vegetation Classification system
 DSC-H7, a 2007 Sony Cyber-shot H series camera
 Halloween H20, the seventh installment in the Halloween series
 Highway H07 (Ukraine), a road in Ukraine
 , a 1915 British H-class submarine
 , a 1932 D-class destroyer of the British Royal Navy
 Influenza A virus subtype H7 (disambiguation), all virus containing the H7 type agglutinin
 , a 1918 United States Navy H-class submarine 
 H7 (monogram), monogram of Haakon VII of Norway and Norwegian World War II resistance symbol
 H7 (lamp), an automotive halogen lamp
 Hydrogen-7 (H-7 or 7H), an isotope of hydrogen

See also
7H (disambiguation)